Entenmann's is an American company that manufactures baked goods and delivers them throughout the United States to supermarkets and other retailers for sale to the public. They are often known to have display cases at the end of store aisles. The company offers dessert cakes, donuts, cookies, cup cakes, loaf cakes, pies, cereal bars, muffins, Danish pastries, crumb cakes, and buns among other baked goods. In the past several years, they have added designer coffee flavors along with scented candles to their product line in an effort to broaden its appeal.

Today, more than 100 different items carry the Entenmann's brand, which is currently owned by Bimbo Bakeries USA.

History
Entenmann's as a company is approximately  years old and it originated in New York City. William Entenmann learned the trade of baking from his father in Stuttgart, Germany, and used his acquired skills to work in a bakery in the U.S., eventually opening his own bakery in 1898 on Rogers Avenue in Brooklyn. Later, William moved his bakery to Bay Shore, Long Island. Home delivery was a substantial part of the bakery that William owned, eventually turning into 30 home delivery routes by the time his son, William Jr., took over the bakery. While William Jr. headed the bakery, it flourished; Frank Sinatra was a weekly customer.

William Jr. died in 1951, leaving the bakery to his wife Martha and their sons, Robert, Charles, and William. The family phased out bread in order to focus on pastries and cakes, and began supplying grocery stores rather than offering home delivery. In 1959, the Entenmann family invented the "see-through" cake box used by many bakeries today. In 1961, the business grew, with new bakeries and factories in Bay Shore, New Jersey, and Connecticut. Charles helped turn the company into a nationally known symbol of sweetness. He excelled at administration and engineering and he presided over the automation of the company’s cake lines. He oversaw the design of a computer-controlled system that delivered ingredients to the mixing vats. 

Plans to expand nationally stalled in 1970. Entenmann's Bakery, with the assistance of new product consultants at Calle and Company, reformulated from heavier New England-style baked goods to lighter offerings more suitable for hotter, more humid test markets such as Miami and Atlanta. Entenmann's successful national expansion quickly followed. In 1972, Entenmann's started to sell chocolate chip cookies, and has since sold more than 620 million cookies. Since its first opening in 1898, Entenmann's has been selling an "all-butter loaf cake", and has sold more than 700 million to date.

The pharmaceutical company Warner-Lambert purchased Entenmann's in 1978, and then sold it to General Foods in 1982. General Foods merged with Kraft in 1990. Kraft General Foods sold its bakery business to CPC International (later Bestfoods) in 1995. Bestfoods was purchased by Unilever in 2000, which sold its baking division to George Weston, a Canadian baked goods and supermarket business, the following year. Weston sold its United States interests including Entenmann's, in 2008 to Mexican conglomerate Grupo Bimbo. Other Bimbo Bakeries USA holdings include Thomas', Brownberry, Boboli, Arnold, Oroweat, Freihofer’s, and Stroehmann.

On March 27, 2014, it was reported that Entenmann's was ceasing baking operations at their Bay Shore, New York location. Other operations, such as sales, the store, and distribution were to continue.

Product line

, Entenmann's products include donuts, loaf cakes, pies, Danish, cookies, Enten-minis—Brownies, and desserts that are packed in smaller servings, cereal bars, and 100 Calorie Little Bites.

In 2007, Entenmann's added a line of coffee products. Coffee Holding Company, Inc. made a three-year licensing agreement with Entenmann's Products, Inc. that gave Coffee Holding Company national rights to the sale and production of coffee that is branded Entenmann's. The agreement was terminated in 2011.

Entenmann's licensed their first non-edible product in September 2008 with the sale of scented candles. The candles were scented as coffee cake, all-butter loaf cake, and raspberry Danish. Other scents such as pumpkin pie and warm gingerbread were added for the holidays, and chocolate chip cookie was made available in spring of 2009.

In 2012, Entenmann's partnered with White Coffee Corporation for a new collection of flavored coffees and cocoa. The 100% arabica coffee is sold at Burlington Coat Factory, Dollar Tree, and Entenmann's Outlets, with expected sales in mass market, supermarkets, club stores, drug stores, and food service nationwide.

Products

All Butter Loaf Cake
Angel Food Loaf Cake
Chocolate Chip Crumb Loaf Cake
Marble Loaf Cake
Banana Cake
Black & White Cake
Black & White Cookies
Carrot Iced Cake
Choc Chip Iced Cake
Chocolate Fudge Cake
Chocolate Truffle Iced Cake
Corn Muffins
Donuts
Hot Cross Buns
Lemon Coconut Cake
Lemon Crunch Cake
Lemon Loaf
Little Bites Snacks
Louisiana Crunch Cake
Marshmallow Iced Devil's Food Cake
New York Crumb Cake
Raisin Loaf Cake
Rugelach
Sour Cream Loaf Cake
Sour Cream Oval
Swiss Chocolate Chip Cake
Thick Fudge Iced Golden Cake
Milk Chocolate Chip Cookies
Original Recipe Chocolate Chip Cookies
Soft Baked Chocolate Chunk Cookies
Pop 'Ems
Raspberry Danish Twist
Cheese Danish Twist
Cheese Filled Crumb Coffee Cake
 Dark Chocolate Cake with Dark Chocolate frosting 
Chocolate Eclairs

Discontinued products

Apple Strudel
Almond Danish Ring
Banana Crunch Cake
Blackout Cake
Blueberry Crumb Pie
Butter Coffee Cake
Cheese Filled Crumb Coffee Cake
Chocolate Flake Square
Coconut Custard Pie
Dulce de Leche Cake
Filled Chocolate Chip Crumb Cake
Fruitcake (Seasonal)
Fudge Nut Brownie Cookies
German Butter Cake
New York Cheesecake
Chewy Snack Barz
Soft fudge iced cupcakes
Brownie Ring (bundt cake with mocha frosting)
Pineapple Cheese Strudel
Golden Walnut Cake Holiday Specialty
 Danish Ring Cake
 Vanilla and Chocolate Cup Cakes
 Vanilla filled Crumb Cake
 Metropolitan Cake
 Walnut Coffee Cake
 Rum Cake

See also
 List of bakeries
 List of brand name breads

References

External links

Brand name breads
Brand name desserts
Food and drink companies of the United States
Bakeries of the United States
Food and drink companies established in 1898
1898 establishments in New York City
Grupo Bimbo brands
Grupo Bimbo subsidiaries